Temple Emanu-El of Dallas, Texas (founded in 1875) was the first Reform Jewish congregation in North Texas, and is the largest synagogue in the South.

History 
Temple Emanu-El of Dallas was founded in 1873 and chartered in 1875. Originally called the Jewish Congregation Emanu-El, it was renamed Temple Emanu-El Congregation in 1974. The small but growing Jewish community felt the need for a permanent religious structure as well as for a rabbi to conduct services and to offer religious education for children, so several families formed Congregation Emanu-El. They elected David Goslin president; Philip Sanger vice president; Emanuel Tillman treasurer; H. Regensburger secretary; and Alexander Sanger, August Israelsky, and Henry Loeb trustees. The next year they built a small red brick temple in the Byzantine style at Commerce and Church (now Field) streets in downtown Dallas. The congregation engaged its first rabbi, Aaron Suhler, in 1875 and joined the Union of American Hebrew Congregations in 1906. In 1957 the temple moved to its present location in north Dallas. Architects Howard R. Meyer and Max M. Sandfield, with noted California architect William Wurster as consultant, received an Award of Merit from the American Institute of Architects for the design of the present structure, which was enhanced by art coordinator György Kepes of the Massachusetts Institute of Technology. Notable rabbis at the temple were David Lefkowitz (1920–49) and Levi A. Olan (1949–72). 

Notable members have included Hattie Leah Henenberg.

Locations 
Temple Emanu-El has had four locations in its history: 
Commerce Street (1876–1898)
Ervay Street (1899–1917)
South Boulevard (1917–1956)
Hillcrest Road (1957–present)

Core values 
According to Temple Emanu-El's website, "Temple Emanu-El is a vibrant Reform Jewish community that strives to be a place of sacred encounter. It is a place where learning, prayer and deeds change people's understanding of themselves, of their world and their responsibilities in it."

Clergy 
The current members of the Temple Emanu-El clergy are:
Rabbi David E. Stern (Senior Rabbi)
Rabbi Debra J. Robbins
Rabbi Kimberly Herzog Cohen
Rabbi Daniel Utley
Rabbi Amy Ross (educator)
Cantor Vicky Glikin (Senior Cantor)
Cantor Leslie Niren

Past Temple Emanu-El senior rabbis include:
Rabbi Joseph Silverman (1884–1885)
 Rabbi George Alexander Kohut (1897–1900)
Rabbi William Greenburg
Rabbi David Lefkowitz (1920–1949)
Rabbi Levi Olan (1948–1970)
Rabbi Gerald J. Klein (1952-2007)
Rabbi Jack Bemporad
Rabbi Sheldon Zimmerman
Rabbi Charles Mintz (interim senior)

Past assistant and associate rabbis and cantors include:
Rabbi Irwin Goldenberg
Rabbi Ellen Lewis
Rabbi Richard Harkavy
Rabbi Liza Stern
Rabbi Mark Kaiserman
Rabbi Peter Berg
Cantor Annie Lynn Bornstein
Rabbi Rachel Goldenberg
Rabbi Oren J. Hayon
Rabbi Asher Knight
Cantor Richard Cohn

Past educators include:
Rabbi Adam Allenberg
Rabbi Barry Diamond
Raymond Israel

Music 
Temple Emanu-El is nationally renowned for its music programs. Samuel Adler created many of the Temple's early musical offerings including their extensive volunteer adult and children's choirs. Simon Sargon expanded the choir's influence and created programs such as the Showcase Series (showcasing jazz, classical, and pops musicians).

References

 Handbook of Texas
 History of Temple Emanu-El
 A Light in the Prairie: Temple Emanu-El of Dallas, 1872-1997
 The American Synagogue A History And Source Book
 Howard Meyer: Temple Emanu-El and Other Works

See also
History of the Jews in Dallas, Texas
Jewish Texan
Temple Emanu-El website

Buildings and structures in Dallas
Religious buildings and structures in Dallas
Religious organizations established in 1875
Reform synagogues in Texas
1875 establishments in Texas
Synagogues completed in 1957